Patrick Francis Gill (August 16, 1868 – May 21, 1923) was a U.S. Representative from Missouri.

Pre-congressional life

Born in Independence, Missouri, Gill moved with his widowed mother to St. Louis, Missouri, in 1871. He attended the parochial schools and St. Louis University in 1890. He engaged in the grocery business and served as clerk of the circuit court from 1904–1908. He was an unsuccessful candidate for sheriff in 1906.

Congressional term

Gill was elected as a Democrat to the Sixty-first Congress (March 4, 1909 – March 3, 1911). He successfully contested the election of Theron E. Catlin to the Sixty-second Congress and served from August 12, 1912, to March 3, 1913. He was an unsuccessful candidate for renomination. He served as mediator in the Bureau of Mediation and Conciliation, Department of Labor, from July 13, 1918, to September 11, 1922. He died in St. Louis, Missouri, May 21, 1923. He was interred in Calvary Cemetery.

References

1868 births
1923 deaths
Democratic Party members of the United States House of Representatives from Missouri
Politicians from Independence, Missouri
Politicians from St. Louis